Scott Johnson is an Australian actor, singer and musician.

Personal life
In November 2004 Scott married his partner of 11 years, actress Rachel Gordon. The two met at the National Institute of Dramatic Art (NIDA) in Sydney.

Career 
Scott graduated from Australia's National Institute of Dramatic Art (NIDA) with a degree in Performing Arts (Acting) in 1996. Since graduation, he has combined stage acting with various roles in Australian television and films. He is also a tutor at the National Institute of Dramatic Art (NIDA) Sydney.

Scott appeared in long-running Australian soap Neighbours in 2007 as Terrence Chesterton, an accomplice to Charlotte Stone, played by his real-life wife, Rachel Gordon. Scott also appeared on Blue Heelers in 2005, during the time that Rachel Gordon had a long-running role as Detective Senior Constable Amy Fox.

He starred for nearly two years as "Tommy DeVito" in the long-running Australian production of Jersey Boys in Melbourne and Sydney.

Theatre Roles
(Not a complete list)

Jersey Boys (2009 - 2011) Jersey Boys Australia
Anatomy Titus Fall of Rome (2008) Queensland Theatre Company (QTC) and Melbourne Theatre Company (MTC)
August Moon (2008) Queensland Theatre Company
Who’s Afraid of Virginia Woolf? (2007) Queensland Theatre Company
Go Pinocchio (2006) Theatre of Image
How Like an Angel (2004) Railway Street Theatre Co
Wonderlands (2003) Hothouse/Griffin Theatre Company
Crimes of the Heart Marion Street Theatre
The Crucible Sydney Theatre Company
Hansel and Gretel  Sydney Theatre Company/Theatre of Image
Third World Blues (1998) Sydney Theatre Company
The Siege of Frank Sinatra (1998) Ensemble Theatre

TV Appearances
(Not a complete list)

 Offspring (2010) as Tim (1 episode)
Neighbours (2007) as Terrence Chesterton (9 episodes)
Blue Heelers (2005) as Steven Prior (3 episodes)
McLeod's Daughters (2002) as Rowan Simmons (1 episode)
Big Sky (1997)

Filmography
(Not a complete list)

Razzle Dazzle: A Journey Into Dance (2007)
Road Rage (2007)
Heaven on the 4th Floor (1998)
Mijn Dino en ik

Awards and nominations
2010 Helpmann Awards. Nomination for Best Supporting Actor in a Musical - Jersey Boys
2010 Sydney Theatre Awards. Nomination for best performance by an actor in a musical or cabaret - Jersey Boys 
2009 Green Room Awards. Nomination for Best Male Artist in a Leading Role (Music Theatre) - Jersey Boys

References

External links
 

Australian male film actors
Australian male television actors
Australian male musical theatre actors
Living people
Year of birth missing (living people)